Jokha Alharthi also spelt al-Harthi, is an Omani writer and academic, known for winning the Man Booker International Prize in 2019 for her novel Sayyidat al-Qamar (Arabic: سيدات القمر), published in English under the title Celestial Bodies. She has written four novels in Arabic, two of which have been translated into English.

Biography 
Born in 1978, Alharthi was educated in Oman and in the United Kingdom. She obtained her PhD in classical Arabic literature from the University of Edinburgh, graduating in 2011. In 2010, Alharthi was offered a professorship in classical Arabic literature at Sultan Qaboos University in Muscat, Oman. As of 2021, she is an associate professor. Alharti has three children.

Alharthi has published three collections of short stories, three children's books, and four novels (Manamat, Sayyidat al-Qamar, Narinjah, and Harir al-Ghazala). She has also authored academic works. Her work has been translated into English, Serbian, Korean, Italian, and German and published in Banipal magazine. Alharthi won the Sultan Qaboos Award for Culture, Arts and Literature for her novel Narinjah (Bitter Orange) in 2016.

Sayyidat al-Qamar was shortlisted for the Zayed Award in 2011. An English translation by Marilyn Booth was published in the UK by Sandstone Press in June 2018 under the title Celestial Bodies, and won the Man Booker International Prize in 2019. Sayyidat el-Qamar was the first work by an Arabic-language writer to be awarded the Man Booker International Prize, and the first novel by an Omani woman to appear in English translation.  The judges heralded the book as "a richly imagined, engaging and poetic insight into a society in transition and into lives previously obscured." As of 2020, translation rights to Sayyidat el-Qamar have been sold in Azerbaijani, Brazilian Portuguese, Bulgarian, Catalan, Chinese, Croatian, English, French, Greek, Hungarian, Italian, Malayalam, Norwegian, Persian, Portuguese, Romanian, Russian, Sinhalese, Slovenian, Swedish, and Turkish.

Alharthi's novel Narinjah, which Marilyn Booth also translated into English under the title Bitter Orange Tree, was received to less acclaim than Sayyidat al-Qamar. In The Guardian, Maya Jaggi wrote a critical review, commenting: "Aided by Booth’s deft touch, some parts affirm the author’s talent for lyrical shifts between past and present, memory and folklore, oneiric surrealism and grimy realism. Yet structural flaws and an overambitious global reach make for a patchy read." In the Washington Post, Ron Charles wrote that the book is an "exquisitely sensitive novel", but that it "spins its wheels without going anywhere." 

Harir al-Ghazala, Alharti's fourth novel to be published in Arabic, tells the story of a woman who was abandoned at birth. It was published by Lebanese publishing house Dar Al Adab in 2021.

Bibliography 
 Manamat (Beirut: Lebanon: al-Mu'assassah al- 'Arabiyah li al-Dirasat wa al-Nashr, 2004).
 Sayyidat al-Qamar (Beirut, Lebanon: Dār al-Ādāb, 2010). Celestial Bodies, trans. Marilyn Booth (Scotland: Sandstone Press, 2018).
 Narinjah (Beirut, Lebanon: Dār al-Ādāb, 2016). Bitter Orange Tree, trans. Marilyn Booth (New York: Catapult, 2022).
 Harir al-Ghazala (Beirut, Lebanon: Dār al-Ādāb, 2021).

See also 
 Huda Hamed 
 Nura al-Badi
 Nasra Al Adawi

References

1978 births
Omani women writers
Omani academics
Living people
Alumni of the University of Edinburgh
Academic staff of Sultan Qaboos University
Omani short story writers
Omani novelists
21st-century short story writers
21st-century novelists
21st-century women writers
Women short story writers
Women novelists
International Booker Prize winners